Lumbini Buddhist University is a tertiary educational institution in Lumbini, Nepal, the birthplace of the Buddha. The idea for the university was conceived at the First World Buddhist Summit held in Lumbini in 1998, and it was officially formed on 17 June 2004.  The Lumbini Buddhist University Act promulgated on 10 November 2006 confirmed its legal status as well as setting out that the university would receive financial assistance from the government of Nepal.

It will offer a four years course for a Bachelor in Buddhism, as well as MA and PhD courses.

Organisation 
 Chancellor: Prime Minister of Nepal (Sher Bahadur Deuba)
 Pro-Chancellor: Minister of Education (Devendra Poudel)
 Vice-Chancellor: Prof. Dr. Hridaya Ratna Bajracharya
 Registrar: Dr. Tilak Ram Acharya
 Dean: Dr. Manik Ratna Shakya

Affiliated colleges 
 Buddha Multiple Campus
 Jiri Buddhist College
 Lotus Buddhist Academic College, Lalitpur
 Lumbini International Academy of Science and Technology
 Lumbini Academic College of Buddhism and Himalayan Studies
 Sowa Rigpa International College
 Sugat Baudha Mahavidyalaya
 Theravada Buddhist Academy
 Tulsipur Metro College (Local Level Government: Tulsipur Metropolis)

See also
 International Theravada Buddhist Missionary University
 State Pariyatti Sasana University, Yangon
 State Pariyatti Sasana University, Mandalay
 Dhammaduta Chekinda University
 Buddhist and Pali University of Sri Lanka
 Mahachulalongkornrajavidyalaya University
 Mahamakut Buddhist University
 International Buddhist Studies College
 Sitagu International Buddhist Academy
 Chittagong Pali College
 Oxford Centre for Buddhist Studies
Gautam Buddha University
Lumbini Development Trust

References

External links
 Official website

Universities and colleges in Nepal
2004 establishments in Nepal
Buddhist universities and colleges
Educational institutions established in 2004